In type theory, a refinement type is a type endowed with a predicate which is assumed to hold for any element of the refined type. Refinement types are thus related to behavioral subtyping.

History

The concept of refinement types was first introduced in Freeman and Pfenning's 1991 Refinement types for ML, which presents a type system for a subset of Standard ML. The type system "preserves the decidability of ML's type inference" whilst still "allowing more errors to be detected at compile-time". In more recent times, refinement type systems have been developed for languages such as Haskell, TypeScript and Scala.

See also

 Liquid Haskell
 Dependent types

References

Type theory
Type systems